Alirajpur railway station (station code: ARPR) is the main railway station in the Indian city of Alirajpur, Madhya Pradesh, India. It opened in 2019.

Arrivals
These trains arrive at the station.

Departures

These trains depart from the station.

See also
 Chhota Udaipur railway station
 Bodeli railway station
 Pratapnagar railway station
 Vadodara railway station
 Vadodara railway division

References 

Railway stations in Madhya Pradesh